The R687 road is a regional road in County Tipperary, Ireland. The route runs from its junction with the R639 at New Inn for approximately  until it meets the N24 in the townland of Rathkeevin, west of Clonmel.

See also
Roads in Ireland
National primary road

References
Roads Act 1993 (Classification of Regional Roads) Order 2006 – Department of Transport

Regional roads in the Republic of Ireland
Roads in County Tipperary